Cherno Omar Barry is the current Vice-Chancellor of the International Open University, president of the Writers Association of The Gambia (WAG), former Executive Secretary at the National Human Rights Commission and Permanent Secretary in several ministries i.e. Ministry of Defence, Ministry of Health and Social Welfare, Ministry of Youth and Sports, Ministry of Higher Education, Research, Science and Technology and Office of The President of The Gambia.

Literary works
 
 Barry, Cherno Omar, Jean-Marie Grassin, and Jean-Dominique Pénel. L'école et la littérature en Gambie. S.l.): [s.n.), 2002.
 Barry, Cherno Omar. La représentation de l'école dans la littérature gambienne: ; mémoire présenté en vue de la Maîtrise-ès-Lettres (Mention Littérature Comparée). 2001.
 Barry, Cherno O, Jean-Marie Grassin, and Jean-Dominique Pénel. La Représentation De L'école Dans La Littérature Gambienne. S.l.: s.n., 2001. Print.

Awards
 Legion of Honour (2018)
 Médaille d’Or de la Fondation Alliance Francaise
 Prix Aminata Maiga Ka de la Nouvelle

References

Living people
Recipients of the Legion of Honour
University of the Gambia people
Saint Mary's University (Halifax) alumni
University of Limoges alumni
Gambian writers
Year of birth missing (living people)